Randy Scott Wittman (born October 28, 1959) is an American former basketball player at the guard position and former coach of the NBA's Cleveland Cavaliers, Minnesota Timberwolves, and Washington Wizards.

Playing career

High school
Wittman starred for Indianapolis Ben Davis High School from 1975–1978.  He averaged more than 23 points a game for Ben Davis, which remains the second-highest average at the school, and became one of the nation's top recruits. In 1978 he was second to Brad Leaf of all Marion County, Indiana, scorers.

College
The 6'6" Wittman played college basketball from 1979–1983 for Bob Knight and the Indiana University Hoosiers. The 1979–80 Hoosiers, led by Isiah Thomas, won the Big Ten championship and advanced to the 1980 Sweet Sixteen. The following season, in 1980–81, the Hoosiers once again won a conference title and advanced to the NCAA Championship, beating the North Carolina Tar Heels.

The Hoosiers trailed the entire first half of the game until Wittman scored at the halftime buzzer with a deep corner shot. The Hoosiers went on to win the game by a 63-50 tally, making the 1981 NCAA tournament the school's fourth national title.

In 1982–1983, with the leadership of Wittman, the No. 1 ranked Hoosiers were favorites to win another national championship. However, with an injury to star player Ted Kitchel mid-season, the Hoosiers' prospects were grim. Knight asked for fan support to rally around the team and, despite long odds, the team ultimately won the Big Ten title. Nevertheless, in the tournament Kitchel's absence was felt and the team lost to Kentucky in the 1983 Sweet Sixteen. Wittman was named the Big Ten Player of the Year and a consensus second team All-American in 1983. He became a member of Indiana's Hall of Fame and was named to Indiana's Silver Anniversary Basketball Team, in March 1996.

Professional
Wittman was selected by the Washington Bullets with the 22nd pick of the 1983 NBA draft. However, he never played for the Bullets with his rights being traded to the Atlanta Hawks.

Wittman spent the early portion of his career with the Hawks, sharing backcourt with Glenn "Doc" Rivers and Anthony "Spud" Webb, and starting most of the games from 1985–88 (while averaging 12 points and 3.5 assists in those years combined).

After a small spell with the Sacramento Kings, he became a fringe player with the Indiana Pacers, retiring in 1991–92 after three unassuming years. For his career, Wittman averaged 7.4 points, 1.1 rebounds and 2.2 assists per game, shooting just over 50% from the field.

Coaching career
In 1992, Wittman began his NBA coaching career as an assistant coach, first with the Pacers. He spent one season in Indianapolis and another with the Dallas Mavericks (and later with the Orlando Magic).

Subsequently, Wittman spent from 1994–99 with the Minnesota Timberwolves, in the same capacity. During that period, he helped in the development of Wolves' star forward Kevin Garnett. Wittman then served as head coach of the Cleveland Cavaliers for two seasons, (1999–2001), compiling a record of 62-102.

On January 23, 2007, Wittman became the head coach of the Timberwolves, succeeding Dwane Casey; he had already started the season as assistant to the former.

On December 8, 2008, club owner Glen Taylor fired Wittman after a 4-19 start, asking Kevin McHale to step in, in a complete change of the organization's structure, as the former Boston Celtics great had been Minnesota's vice-president of basketball operations since 1995.

Wittman became acting head coach of the Washington Wizards, accepting the position after Flip Saunders was fired in January 2012 for a 2-15 start.  On June 4, 2012, the Wizards announced that Wittman would be retained as the official head coach of the team for the 2012–2013 season.

The Wizards improved from 29-53 to 44-38 during the 2013–14 season, which included advancing to the second round of the playoffs for just the third time since 1979 before losing to the Indiana Pacers in six games. The Wizards had a 5-1 record in away games during both series, but were unable to win a home game in the second round. Wittman was praised for his strategy and leadership throughout the playoffs by both players and management alike.

Wittman signed an extension to remain head coach of the Wizards on June 3, 2014.

The Wizards fired Wittman on April 13, 2016 after the team missed the playoffs.

Personal life
His son Ryan Wittman starred for the Cornell Big Red basketball team; he helped lead the Big Red to their first NCAA Tournament appearance in 20 years during the 2007–08 season, again in 2009, and to Cornell's first-ever NCAA basketball tournament victories in 2010 over the Temple Owls and Wisconsin Badgers as the Big Red made its first-ever trip to the NCAA Men's Sweet 16.

Head coaching record

|-
| align="left" |Cleveland
| align="left" |
|82||32||50|||| align="center" |6th in Central|||—||—||—||—
| align="center" |Missed playoffs
|- 
| align="left" |Cleveland
| align="left" |
|82||30||52|||| align="center" |6th in Central|||—||—||—||—
| align="center" |Missed playoffs
|- 
| align="left" |Minnesota
| align="left" |
|42||12||30|||| align="center" |4th in Northwest|||—||—||—||—
| align="center" |Missed playoffs
|- 
| align="left" |Minnesota
| align="left" |
|82||22||60|||| align="center" |5th in Northwest|||—||—||—||—
| align="center" |Missed playoffs
|- 
| align="left" |Minnesota
| align="left" |
|19||4||15|||| align="center" |(fired)|||—||—||—||—
| align="center" |—
|- 
| align="left" |Washington
| align="left" |
|49||18||31|||| align="center" |4th in Southeast|||—||—||—||—
| align="center" |Missed playoffs
|- 
| align="left" |Washington
| align="left" |
|82||29||53|||| align="center" |3rd in Southeast|||—||—||—||—
| align="center" |Missed playoffs
|-
| align="left" |Washington
| align="left" |
|82||44||38|||| align="center" |2nd in Southeast||11||6||5||
| align="center" |Lost in Conference Semifinals
|-
| align="left" |Washington
| align="left" |
|82||46||36|||| align="center" |2nd in Southeast||10||6||4||
| align="center" |Lost in Conference Semifinals
|- 
| align="left" |Washington
| align="left" |
|82||41||41|||| align="center" |4th in Southeast|||—||—||—||—
| align="center" |Missed playoffs
|-class="sortbottom"
| align="center" colspan="2"|Career
| 684||278||406|||| ||21||12||9||

References

External links
 BasketballReference stats
 BasketballReference coach stats
 NBA.com coach profile

1959 births
Living people
All-American college men's basketball players
American men's basketball coaches
American men's basketball players
Atlanta Hawks players
Basketball coaches from Indiana
Basketball players from Indianapolis
Cleveland Cavaliers head coaches
Dallas Mavericks assistant coaches
Indiana Hoosiers men's basketball players
Indiana Pacers assistant coaches
Indiana Pacers players
Minnesota Timberwolves assistant coaches
Minnesota Timberwolves head coaches
Orlando Magic assistant coaches
Sacramento Kings players
Shooting guards
Washington Bullets draft picks
Washington Wizards assistant coaches
Washington Wizards head coaches